The 2018–19 VfB Stuttgart season was the 126th season in the football club's history and 2nd consecutive and 53rd overall season in the top flight of German football, the Bundesliga, having been promoted from the 2. Bundesliga in 2017. In addition to the domestic league, VfB Stuttgart also participated in this season's edition of the domestic cup, the DFB-Pokal. This was the 86th season for Stuttgart in the Mercedes-Benz Arena, located in Stuttgart, Baden-Württemberg, Germany. The season covers a period from 1 July 2018 to 30 June 2019.

Players

Squad information

Friendly matches

Competitions

Overview

Bundesliga

League table

Results summary

Results by round

Matches

Relegation play-offs

DFB-Pokal

Statistics

Appearances and goals

|-
! colspan=14 style=background:#dcdcdc; text-align:center| Goalkeepers

|-
! colspan=14 style=background:#dcdcdc; text-align:center| Defenders

|-
! colspan=14 style=background:#dcdcdc; text-align:center| Midfielders

|-
! colspan=14 style=background:#dcdcdc; text-align:center| Forwards

|-
! colspan=14 style=background:#dcdcdc; text-align:center| Players transferred out during the season

References

VfB Stuttgart seasons
Stuttgart